Events in the year 1911 in Brazil.

Incumbents

Federal government 
 President: Marshal Hermes da Fonseca 
 Vice President: Venceslau Brás

Governors 
 Alagoas: Euclid Vieira Malta
 Amazonas: Antônio Clemente Ribeiro Bittencourt
 Bahia: João Ferreira de Araújo Pinho, then Aurélio Rodrigues Viana
 Ceará: Antônio Nogueira Accioli
 Goiás: Urbano Coelho de Gouveia
 Maranhão: Luís Antônio Domingues da Silva
 Mato Grosso: Pedro Celestino Corrêa da Costa, then Joaquim Augusto da Costa Marques
 Minas Gerais: Júlio Bueno Brandão
 Pará: João Antônio Luís Coelho
 Paraíba: João Lopes Machado
 Paraná: Francisco Xavier da Silva
 Pernambuco: Herculano Bandeira de Melo(till 6 September); Estácio Coimbra (6 September - 13 December); João da Costa Bezerra de Carvalho (13 December - 19 December); Emídio Dantas Barreto (from 19 December)
 Piauí: Antonino Freire da Silva
 Rio Grande do Norte: Alberto Maranhão 
 Rio Grande do Sul: Carlos Barbosa Gonçalves
 Santa Catarina:
 São Paulo: 
 Sergipe:

Vice governors 
 Rio Grande do Norte:
 São Paulo:

Events 
 10 January - The cargo ship  runs aground off the coast of  Rio Grande do Norte.
 March - Future President Getúlio Vargas marries Darcy Lima Sarmanho.
 5 March - The Faculdade de Medicina da Universidade Federal de Minas Gerais, one of the earliest medical schools in the country, is founded in Belo Horizonte.
 1 April - Guarani Futebol Clube is founded in Campinas, São Paulo, by a group of 12 students. 
 15 November - Clube 15 de Novembro is founded at Campo Bom in Rio Grande do Sul.

Arts and culture

Books 
 Lima Barreto - Triste Fim de Policarpo Quaresma

Films 
 O conde de Luxemburgo

Births 
 8 February - Lélia Abramo, Italian-Brazilian actress and political activist (died 2004)
 19 February - Prince Luiz Gastão of Orléans-Braganza, descendant of the Brazilian Imperial Family (died 1931)
 15 March - Afrânio Coutinho, literary critic and essayist (died 2000)
 12 May - Charles Sergel, surgeon, missionary doctor and Olympic rower (died 1980) 
 14 August - Bernardo Segall, film composer (died in 1993)
 21 August - Golbery do Couto e Silva, military leader (died 1987)
 24 October - Manuel Martins, artist (died 1979) 
 5 December - Carlos Marighella, Marxist revolutionary and writer (died 1969)

Deaths 
 26 July - José Alves de Cerqueira César, politician (born 1835)
 13 September - Raimundo Correia, poet, judge and magistrate (born 1859)

References

See also 
1911 in Brazilian football

 
1910s in Brazil
Years of the 20th century in Brazil
Brazil
Brazil